Kadavulai Kanden is a 1963 Indian Tamil-language film directed by A. S. A. Sami. The film stars M. R. Radha, Kalyan Kumar, Sowcar Janaki and Devika.

Plot

Cast 
The list was adapted from the book Thiraikalanjiyam.

Male cast
M. R. Radha
Kalyan Kumar
R. Muthuraman
Nagesh
J. P. Chandrababu
Muthaiah
Karikkol Raju
M. R. R. Vasu

Female cast
Sowcar Janaki
Devika
Gemini Chandra
Sukumari
Kumari Rukmini

Soundtrack 
Music was composed by K. V. Mahadevan while the lyrics were penned by Kannadasan. The song "Poi Sonnare, Poi Sonnare" was released only on 78 RPM record. The song, "Konjam Sindhikkanum" is loosely based on the Russian song, "Dark Eyes".

Reception 
Kanthan of Kalki called the story odd, but appreciated the dialogues. He said the film could be watched once for Chandrababu's comedy.

References

External links 

1960s Tamil-language films
1963 drama films
Films scored by K. V. Mahadevan
Indian drama films